Californiulus euphanus is a millipede that lives in the north-western United States (Oregon and Washington).

References 

Julida
Millipedes of North America
Fauna of the Northwestern United States
Endemic fauna of the United States
Animals described in 1938